Hinduism is a minority faith in Oman practised by 5.5% of its population. Oman is the only country in the Middle East with an indigenous Hindu minority. Hindus in Oman are represented by the religious organization Hindu Mahajan Temple.

History
Hinduism first came to Oman in 1507 when  Kutchi speaking Hindus arrived in Muscat from Kutch region in India. There were at least 4,000 Hindus in Oman in the early 19th century. In 1895, the Hindu colony in Muscat came under attack by the Ibadhis and by 1900, the number of Hindus decreased to 300. During the independence of Oman, only a few dozen Hindus remained in Oman. The historical Hindu Quarters of al-Waljat and al-Banyan where Hindus lived are no longer occupied by Hindus.

Demographics
Oman is the only country in the Middle East with an indigenous Hindu population. There are at least 1000 Indians (mostly Hindus) in Oman with Omani citizenship. According to the CIA, there are 259,780 Hindus constituting 5.5% of population.

Temples

There are two officially recognized Hindu temples in Oman.
Shiva temple in Muscat in Oman is one of the oldest Hindu temples in the Middle East region.
Krishna Temple in Muscat.

Famous Hindus in Oman
Kanaksi Khimji - only Hindu Sheikh in the world
Suraj Kumar, Cricketer

See also
Hinduism in Arab states
BAPS Shri Swaminarayan Mandir Abu Dhabi
Shrinathji Temple, Bahrain

References

Hinduism in Oman
Middle Eastern culture